Greatest Remix Hits may refer to:

 Greatest Remix Hits (2 Unlimited album), 2006
 Greatest Remix Hits (album series)